The Red Bluff First Nation is a Dakelh First Nations government located in the northern Fraser Canyon region of the Canadian province of British Columbia.  It is a member of the Carrier-Chilcotin Tribal Council, which includes both Tsilhqot'in and Carrier (Dakelh) communities.

The Red Bluff First Nation reserve community and offices are located near Quesnel.

Chief and Councillors
Chief: Clifford Lebrun
Councillor: Cindy Aldred
Councillor:  Denise Paul
Councillor:  Wanda Aldred

Indian Reserves

Indian Reserves under the administration of the Red Bluff First Nation are:
Dragon Lake Indian Reserve No. 3, 3 miles E of Quesnel, 14.80 ha. 
Quesnel Indian Reserve No. 1, on left (E) bank of the Fraser River, 1 mile S of Quesnel, 552.70 ha. 
Rich Bar Indian Reserve No. 4, on left (E) bank of the Fraser River, 3 miles S of Quesnel, 96.40 ha. 
Sinnce-tah-lah Indian Reserve No. 2, on right (W) bank of the Fraser River, 2 miles S of Quesnel, west of Quesnel IR No. 1, 18.80 ha.

See also
Dakelh
Carrier language
Carrier-Chilcotin Tribal Council
Tsilhqot'in Tribal Council

References

Cariboo
Dakelh governments